Astathes bella is a species of beetle in the family Cerambycidae. It was described by Gahan in 1901. It is known from Sulawesi.

References

B
Beetles described in 1901